The second season of the American television series Atlanta, titled Robbin' Season, premiered on March 1, 2018. The season is produced by RBA, 343 Incorporated, MGMT. Entertainment, and FXP, with Donald Glover, Paul Simms, Dianne McGunigle, Stephen Glover, and Hiro Murai serving as executive producers. Donald Glover serves as creator and wrote two episodes for the season.

The season was ordered in September 2016. It stars Donald Glover, Brian Tyree Henry, LaKeith Stanfield, and Zazie Beetz. The series follows Earn during his daily life in Atlanta, Georgia, as he tries to redeem himself in the eyes of his ex-girlfriend Van, who is also the mother of his daughter Lottie; as well as his parents and his cousin Alfred, who raps under the stage name "Paper Boi"; and Darius, Alfred's eccentric right-hand man.

The season premiered on March 1, 2018, on FX. The season premiere received 0.851 million viewers with a 0.4 ratings share in the 18–49 demographics. The season ended on May 10, 2018, with an average of 0.64 million viewers, which was a 28% decrease from the previous season. The season received critical acclaim, with critics praising its cast, writing, creativity, and suspenseful atmosphere, with many deeming it an improvement over the previous season. At the 70th Primetime Emmy Awards, the season was nominated for 8 awards, including Outstanding Comedy Series. In June 2018, FX renewed the series for a third season.

Cast and characters

Main
 Donald Glover as Earnest "Earn" Marks / Teddy Perkins
 Brian Tyree Henry as Alfred "Paper Boi" Miles
 LaKeith Stanfield as Darius
 Zazie Beetz as Vanessa "Van" Keefer

Recurring 
 Khris Davis as Tracy
 RJ Walker as Clark County

Guest 
 Katt Williams as Willie
 Michael Vick as himself
 Robert Powell III as Bibby
 Adriyan Rae as Candice
 Danielle Deadwyler as Tami
 Alkoya Brunson as Young Earn
 Myles Truitt as Devin Meyers

Episodes

Production

Development
The series was renewed for a second season in September 2016. For the season, it carried the title "Robbin' Season". Executive producer Stephen Glover explained that the name comes from "a time in Atlanta right before Christmastime and New Year's. Basically, a bunch of crime happens in the city right during that time."

Writing
Donald Glover said that the season's structure was inspired by Tiny Toon Adventures: How I Spent My Vacation, which was "broken up into eight or nine episodes but when watched together, they played like a movie. You enjoy them more when they're together."

Stephen Glover said that the season would explore more about the city, "We get to see daily slices of people's lives and what makes living in a city like Atlanta a weird kind of experience. Atlanta is very weird, because it's a super-black town, but at the same time, there's other cultures there, there's history there. There's all these things that make it unique. I think you'll get to hopefully get immersed in what it is to live in that place on a daily basis, or to meet some of the people that you would meet."

Casting
Chris Rock contacted Stephen Glover and gave him a piece of advice saying, "Everybody is going to want to be on this show. Don't let anyone be on it. When people like me start asking you to be on it, that's when you don't let them be on it."

Release

Broadcast
Due to Glover's acting commitment to Solo: A Star Wars Story, the season was delayed until 2018. In January 2018, FX confirmed that the season would premiere on March 1, 2018.

The sixth episode, "Teddy Perkins", aired commercial-free. Collider said that the decision to run the episode commercial-free aided the episode's message of "being trapped", a theme also explored in other episodes of Atlantas second season.

Marketing
On February 13, 2018, the official trailer for the season was released.

Home media release
The season was released on DVD on December 17, 2019.

Reception

Ratings

Critical reception

The second season received critical acclaim. On Rotten Tomatoes, it has an approval rating of 98%, based on 65 reviews, with an average rating of 9.10/10. The site's critical consensus reads, "Donald Glover continues to subvert expectations with a sophomore season of Atlanta that proves as excellent as it is eccentric." On Metacritic, the second season has a score of 97 out of 100, based on 28 critics, indicating "universal acclaim".

After the season ended, Alan Sepinwall of Uproxx deemed the season as an improvement over the previous season, writing "on the whole, the Glovers, Hiro Murai, and everyone else involved in this remarkable program did exactly what they seemed to be doing at the start: following a basic narrative about Earn and Al's partnership from beginning to end." Emily VanDerWerff of Vox named it the best series of the year, writing "It's exactly the sort of thing TV is great at but that the medium does too rarely. It feels bigger than itself, with every episode spinning off into new tangents and chasing down additional rabbit trails."

Critics' top ten lists
The season topped many "Best of 2018" lists and was the second most mentioned series of the year.

Awards and nominations

Notes

References

External links 
 
 

Atlanta (TV series)
2018 American television seasons